Scottish Command or Army Headquarters Scotland (from 1972) is a command of the British Army.

History

Early history

Great Britain was divided into military districts on the outbreak of war with France in 1793. The Scottish District was commanded by the Commander-in-Chief, Scotland. In January 1876 a ‘Mobilization Scheme for the forces in Great Britain and Ireland’ was published, with the ‘Active Army’ divided into eight army corps based on the District Commands. 8th Corps was to be formed within Scottish Command, based at Edinburgh.  This scheme disappeared in 1881, when the districts were retitled ‘District Commands.

Early twentieth century
The 1901 Army Estimates introduced by St John Brodrick allowed for six army corps based on six regional commands. As outlined in a paper published in 1903, VI Corps was to be formed in a reconstituted Scottish Command, with HQ at Edinburgh. Lieutenant General Sir Charles Tucker was appointed acting General Officer Commanding-in-Chief (GOCinC) of VI Corps in April 1903. Scottish Command was established in 1905 at Edinburgh Castle but moved to Craigiehall in 1955.

First World War
Army Order No 324, issued on 21 August 1914, authorised the formation of a 'New Army' of six Divisions, manned by volunteers who had responded to Earl Kitchener's appeal (hence the First New Army was known as 'K1'). Each division was to be under the administration of one of the Home Commands, and Scottish Command formed what became the 9th (Scottish) Division. It was followed by 15th (Scottish) Division of K2 in September 1914. The 64th (2nd Highland) Division was established in the Command by 1915 after the departure of 51st (Highland) Division for France.

Second World War
In September 1939 consisted of Highland Area with 9th (Highland) Infantry Division and 51st (Highland) Infantry Division, and Lowland Area with 15th (Scottish) Infantry Division and 52nd (Lowland) Infantry Division, plus other troops. By 1940 during the Battle of Britain the command was responsible to Commander-in-Chief, Home Forces.

As France was capitulating, General Władysław Sikorski. the Polish commander-in-chief and prime minister, was able to evacuate many Polish troops—probably over 20,000—to the United Kingdom. After initially regrouping in southern Scotland these Polish ground units (as I Corps, comprising the 1st Independent Rifle Brigade, the 10th Motorised Cavalry Brigade (as infantry) and cadre brigades largely manned by surplus officers at battalion strength) took over responsibility in October 1940 for the defence of the counties of Fife and Angus; this included reinforcing coastal defences that had already been started. I Corps was under the direct command of Scottish Command. While in this area the Corps was reorganised and expanded.

Post War
In 1950, the 51st/52nd (Scottish) Division was split, restoring the independence of the 52nd Lowland Division, which took regional command of Territorial Army units based in the Scottish Lowlands, including the Territorial infantry battalions of the Lowland Brigade regiments.

In 1948, the 9th Special Communications Unit was formed in Forfar administered by Scottish Command. The 30th Armoured Brigade was reformed in Scotland after the war as a fully Territorial Army formation, known as the 30th (Lowland) Independent Armoured Brigade. It was headquartered in Glasgow. 

In 1955, Headquarters Scottish Command moved into modern facilities at Craigiehall, close to Cramond, around 9 km (5.6 mi) west of central Edinburgh. At this time, the General Officer Commanding-in-Chief had 92 separate locations under his command, with 2,500 regular service men and women and 8,800 members of the Territorial Army, representing 14% of the total across the UK.

The Command was merged into HQ United Kingdom Land Forces (HQ UKLF) in 1972 and the headquarters in Scotland was downgraded to the status of a district, known as Army Headquarters Scotland. Scotland continued to have district status until 2000 when the last General Officer Commanding Scotland stood down and the Army HQ Scotland was replaced by HQ 2nd Infantry Division with control of troops in Scotland and the North of England.

General Officers Commanding 
Commanders-in-Chief have included:

Commander-in-Chief, Scottish Army
 1661–1663: John Middleton, 1st Earl of Middleton
 1663–1667: John Leslie, 7th Earl of Rothes
 1667–1674: George Livingston, 3rd Earl of Linlithgow (acting)
 1674–1677: Sir George Munro
 1677–1679: George Livingston, 3rd Earl of Linlithgow
 1679–1679: James Scott, 1st Duke of Monmouth and Buccleuch
 1679–1685: Thomas Dalyell
 1685–1685: George Douglas, 1st Earl of Dumbarton
 1685–1688: William Drummond, 1st Viscount Strathallan
 1688–1688: James Douglas
 1689–1690: Hugh Mackay
 1690–1697: Sir Thomas Livingstone, Viscount Teviot

Commander-in-Chief, Scotland (or North Britain)
 1702–1705: George Ramsay
 1706–1710: David Melville, 3rd Earl of Leven
 1710–1712: David Colyear, 1st Earl of Portmore
 1712–1716: John Campbell, 2nd Duke of Argyll
 1716–1724: George Carpenter, 1st Baron Carpenter
 1724–1740: George Wade
 ...
 1743–1745: Sir John Cope
 1745–1745: Roger Handasyd
 1745–1746: Henry Hawley (Prince William, Duke of Cumberland in overall command)
 1746–1747: William Anne Keppel, 2nd Earl of Albemarle
 1747–1752: Humphrey Bland
 1752–1753: George Churchill
 1753–1756: Humphrey Bland
 1756–1767: Lord George Beauclerk
 1767–1778: John Campbell, Marquess of Lorne
 1778–1780: Sir James Adolphus Oughton
 1780–1787: Alexander Mackay
 ...
 1789–1798: Lord Adam Gordon
 1798–1799: Sir Ralph Abercromby
 ...
 1803–1806: Francis Rawdon-Hastings, 2nd Earl of Moira
 1806–1812: William Cathcart, 1st Viscount Cathcart
 1812–1816: Henry Wynyard
 1816–1819: Sir John Hope
 1819–1825: Lieutenant-General Sir Thomas Bradford
 1825–1830: Lieutenant-General Sir Robert O'Callaghan
 1830–1837: General Patrick Stuart
 1837–1842: General Lord Greenock
 1842–1847: Lieutenant-General Sir Neil Douglas
 1847–1852: General Henry Riddell
 1852–1854: General Sir Thomas Napier
 1854–1860: General Viscount Melville
 1860–1861: Major-General Duncan Cameron
 1861–1867: Major-General Edward Forestier-Walker

Commanding the troops in the North British District
 1868–1873: Major-General Randal Rumley
 1873–1875: Major-General Sir John Douglas
 1875–1878: Major-General John Stuart
 1878–1880: Major-General Robert Bruce
 1880–1881: Major-General William Hope
 1881–1885: Major-General Alastair Macdonald
 1885–1888: Major-General Alexander Elliot
 1888–1893: Major-General Sir Arthur Lyttelton-Annesley

Commanding the troops in the Scottish District
 1893–1894: Major-General Arthur Lyon Fremantle
 1894–1896: Major-General Sir Hugh Rowlands

General Officer Commanding-in-Chief Scottish District
1896 – 1901 Lieutenant General Sir Edward Chapman
1901 – 1903 Lieutenant General Sir Archibald Hunter
1903 – 1905 Lieutenant General Sir Charles Tucker

General Officer Commanding-in-Chief Scottish Command
1905 Lieutenant General Sir Charles Tucker
1905 – 1909 Lieutenant General Sir Edward Leach
1909 – 1913 Lieutenant General Sir Bruce Hamilton
1913 – 1914 Lieutenant General Sir James Wolfe Murray
1914 – 1918 Lieutenant General Sir Spencer Ewart
1918 – 1919 Lieutenant General Sir Frederick McCracken
1919 – 1923 Lieutenant General Sir Francis Davies
1923 – 1926 Lieutenant General Sir Walter Braithwaite
1926 – 1930 Lieutenant General Sir William Peyton
1930 – 1933 General Sir Percy Radcliffe
1933 – 1937 General Sir Archibald Cameron
1937 – 1940 General Sir Charles Grant
1940 – 1941 Lieutenant General Sir Harold Carrington
1941 – 1945 Lieutenant General Sir Andrew Thorne
1945 – 1947 Lieutenant General Sir Neil Ritchie
1947 – 1949 Lieutenant General Sir Philip Christison
1949 – 1952 Lieutenant General Sir Gordon MacMillan
1952 – 1955 Lieutenant General Sir Colin Barber
1955 – 1958 Lieutenant General Sir Horatius Murray
1958 – 1961 Lieutenant General Sir George Collingwood
1961 – 1964 Lieutenant General Sir William Turner
1964 – 1966 Lieutenant General Sir George Gordon-Lennox
1966 – 1969 Lieutenant General Sir Derek Lang
1969 – 1972 Lieutenant General Sir Henry Leask

General Officer Commanding, Scotland
1972 – 1976 Lieutenant General Sir Chandos Blair
1976 – 1979 Lieutenant General Sir David Scott-Barrett
1979 – 1980 Lieutenant General Sir Michael Gow
1980 – 1982 Lieutenant General Sir David Young
1982 – 1985 Lieutenant General Sir Alexander Boswell
1985 – 1988 Lieutenant General Sir Norman Arthur
1988 – 1991 Lieutenant General Sir John MacMillan
1991 – 1993 Lieutenant General Sir Peter Graham
1993 – 1995 Major-General Michael Scott
1995 – 1997 Major-General Jonathan Hall
1997 – 2000 Major-General Mark Strudwick
Note: There was no General Officer Commanding, Scotland between 2000 and 2012
2012 – 2015 Major-General Nick Eeles

Military Secretary and General Officer, Scotland
2015–2017 Major-General Nicholas Ashmore
2017–2019 Major-General Bob Bruce
2019–2021 Major-General Tim Hyams
2021–present Major-General William Wright

References

Commands of the British Army
Military of Scotland
1905 establishments in Scotland